Sergia  is a genus of plants in the family Campanulaceae. It contains two known species, both native to Central Asia.
 
 Sergia regelii (Trautv.) Fed. in V.L.Komarov - Tadzhikistan
 Sergia sewerzowii (Regel) Fed. in V.L.Komarov  - Kazakhstan

References

External links
Plantarium, Сергия Регеля, Sergia regelii  photo

Campanuloideae
Campanulaceae genera